Yves Bélanger (born July 7, 1960) is a Canadian cinematographer. He has worked on films by directors such as Alain DesRochers, Xavier Dolan and Clint Eastwood, and he was a frequent collaborator of Jean-Marc Vallée. In 2016, he received a Canadian Screen Award for Best Cinematography for his work in Brooklyn.

Life and career
Bélanger grew up in Sainte-Foy, Quebec. He first became interested in film at eight years old when his father showed him 2001: A Space Odyssey, and he began making short films when he was 13. He studied film at Concordia University, where he contemplated becoming a director or cinematographer, ultimately deciding on the latter. He graduated with a BFA in 1984.

Bélanger began working as a cinematographer in 1989, working initially on music videos before moving to advertising. He started working on films and television series in 1995, alongside directors including Alain DesRochers, Jean-Claude Lord and Alan Metter. He first became recognized in 2001 with the short film Killing Time, for which he received a Canadian Society of Cinematographers award nomination. He worked on another short film, Wildflowers, which won a CSC award in 2003, and he received a third nomination for the 2006 film Cheech. He filmed Laurence Anyways (2012) with the arthouse director Xavier Dolan. Bélanger later said about Dolan's style, "it's not my cup of tea. It's very colorful, very crazy ... I'm more like a naturalist." His work on Laurence Anyways garnered a Camerimage award nomination.

After finishing Laurence Anyways, Bélanger was contacted by director Jean-Marc Vallée, who asked him to work on his upcoming film Dallas Buyers Club (2013). Bélanger and Vallée had known each other for around 20 years but had never worked together before. Dallas Buyers Club marked Bélanger's breakout in the mainstream film industry; he was 53 years old at the time and two decades into his career. A year later, he and Vallée collaborated a second time, on Wild (2014). The film, which is about a woman who hikes the Pacific Crest Trail, was filmed on a small budget with a minimal crew and mostly handheld camerawork. His cinematography on Wild received a Camerimage nomination.

Bélanger then shot the period drama film Brooklyn (2015), directed by John Crowley. He became involved after Bruna Papandrea, one of the producers of Wild, introduced Bélanger to Crowley. For Brooklyn, he received a Canadian Screen Award for Best Cinematography. His third collaboration with Vallée was Demolition, released in 2016, and their fourth was the HBO miniseries Big Little Lies (2017).

Filmography

Film

Television
2017 - Big Little Lies - 7 episodes
2018 - Sharp Objects - 7 episodes
2021 - Nine Perfect Strangers

References

External links
 

1960 births
Living people
People from Sainte-Foy, Quebec City
Canadian cinematographers
Concordia University alumni
Best Cinematography Genie and Canadian Screen Award winners
Best Cinematography Jutra and Iris Award winners